The 6th Parliament of Singapore was a meeting of the Parliament of Singapore. Its first session commenced on 25 February 1985 and was prorogued on 27 January 1986. It commenced its second session on 20 February 1986 and was dissolved on 17 August 1988.

The members of the 6th Parliament were elected in the 1984 general election. Parliament was controlled by a People's Action Party majority, led by Prime Minister Lee Kuan Yew and his Cabinet. The Speaker was Dr Yeoh Ghim Seng. The de facto Leader of the Opposition was J B Jeyaretnam of the Workers' Party until he lost his parliamentary seat following his convictions, and was replaced by Chiam See Tong of the Singapore Democratic Party.

Officeholders 

 Speaker: Yeoh Ghim Seng (PAP)
 Deputy Speaker: Tan Soo Khoon (PAP), from 1 March 1985
 Prime Minister: Lee Kuan Yew (PAP)
 Deputy Prime Minister:
 Goh Chok Tong (PAP)
 Ong Teng Cheong (PAP)
 Leader of the Opposition:
 J. B. Jeyaretnam (WP), until 10 November 1986
 Chiam See Tong (SDP), from 10 November 1986
 Leader of the House:
 S. Dhanabalan (PAP), until 24 February 1987
 Wong Kan Seng (PAP), from 25 February 1987
 Party Whip of the People's Action Party: Lee Yiok Seng
 Deputy Party Whip of the People's Action Party:
 Lee Hsien Loong, until 27 January 1987
 Eugene Yap, from 28 January 1987

Composition

Members

Elected Members of Parliament 
This is the list of members of the 6th Parliament of Singapore elected in the 1985 general election.

Non-Constituency Member of Parliament 
One Non-constituency Member of Parliament seat was allocated in the 6th Parliament of Singapore.

Changes in members

Appointments

Vacant seats

References 

Parliament of Singapore